Symplocos costaricana is a species of plant in the family Symplocaceae. It is native to Central America.

Conservation
Symplocos molinae was assessed as critically endangered in the 1998 IUCN Red List, where it was said to be native only to Honduras. , Symplocos molinae is regarded as a synonym of Symplocos costaricana, which has a wider distribution in Central America, and is assessed as least concern.

References

costaricana
Flora of Central America
Taxonomy articles created by Polbot